Miller Glacier is a glacier about  wide, described by Griffith Taylor as a transection glacier lying in a transverse trough and connecting Cotton Glacier and Debenham Glacier in Victoria Land, Antarctica. It was discovered by the Western Geological Party, led by Taylor, of the British Antarctic Expedition, 1910–13, and was named by Taylor for M.J. Miller, Mayor of Lyttelton, and the shipwright who repaired the expedition vessel, Terra Nova, prior to its voyage from New Zealand.

References

Glaciers of Victoria Land
Scott Coast